Dhiru Patel (born 29 April 1943) is an Indian cricketer. He played first-class cricket for Gujarat from 1966 to 1970, before playing for Northern Districts in New Zealand for the 1971/72 season.

See also
 List of Northern Districts representative cricketers

References

External links
 

1943 births
Living people
Indian cricketers
Gujarat cricketers
Northern Districts cricketers
People from Navsari district